The Star Reporter is a 1932 British crime drama, directed by Michael Powell and starring Harold French and Garry Marsh.  The screenplay was adapted from a story by popular thriller writer Philip MacDonald.

The Star Reporter is one of eleven quota quickies directed by Powell between 1931 and 1936 of which no print is known to survive.  The film is not held in the BFI National Archive, and is classed as "missing, believed lost".

Powell later recalled that the film was brought in on a budget of £3,700, and that he had rented a hand-held camera for £8 and travelled to Southampton to film a docking ocean liner for use in an intercut scene.  He said "The Star Reporter was fun and I was not ashamed of it".  The film was shown in the UK as the support feature to the Jean Harlow vehicle Platinum Blonde, and Powell also remembered his amusement when a critic observed sniffily that his film lacked the polish of the main feature, reasoning that this was perhaps to be expected when comparing his budget with the $600,000 which had reportedly been spent on the Harlow picture.

Plot
Major Starr (French) is an ambitious newspaper reporter who has taken undercover employment as chauffeur to Lady Susan Loman (Isla Bevan) in the hope of witnessing high-society goings-on which he can use in a feature article he is planning.  Lady Susan's father Lord Longbourne (Spencer Trevor) meanwhile is experiencing financial embarrassment, and is persuaded by professional criminal Mandel (Marsh) to conspire in an insurance scam whereby Mandel will steal a diamond belonging to Lady Susan from the West End jeweller where it is currently on display, Longbourne will claim the cash and Mandel will return the diamond to him for a cut of the proceeds.

Mandel steals the diamond in an audacious smash-and-grab raid but the crime is witnessed by Starr and Lady Susan, who happen to be passing at the time.  Starr heads off in pursuit of Mandel and corners him on a rooftop.  There is a struggle and Mandel falls to his death.  With the scam foiled and the diamond retrieved, Starr proposes to Lady Susan, who is happy to accept.

Cast
 Harold French as Major Starr
 Garry Marsh as Mandel
 Isla Bevan as Lady Susan Loman
 Spencer Trevor as Lord Longbourne
 Anthony Holles as Bonzo
 Noel Dainton as Colonel
 Elsa Graves as Oliver
 Philip Morant as Jeff

Reception
Surviving contemporary reviews indicate a positive reception for the film.  Today's Cinema assessed it as: "cleverly directed on the lines of swift action, snappy dialogue and varied settings", while the London Evening News reviewer enthused: "'At the end of a long and not very inspiring day of seeing new films, I saw a little picture Star Reporter which jolted my tired brain into renewed enthusiasm. Star Reporter packs into three-quarters of an hour as much story as most films that last an hour and a half...(it) tells an exciting crook story with a smoothness of direction and a crispness of acting and cutting which would be a credit to the most ambitious picture."  Picturegoer Weekly predicted, wrongly as it turned out: "It is all very ingenious and is chiefly notable for the introduction of Isla Bevan, a new star, who looks like making good" (Bevan's film career in fact encompassed only five more programmers, and was over by 1936) and added "the picture generally is quite fairly entertaining, if one is not too critical".

References

External links 
 
 
 

1932 films
1932 crime drama films
Films directed by Michael Powell
Films by Powell and Pressburger
Lost British films
British black-and-white films
1930s English-language films
Films based on British novels
British crime drama films
1932 lost films
1930s British films
Quota quickies